Thiruvilwamala is a hilly village in the northern terrain of Thrissur district of Kerala state in southern India. It is located 47 kilometres northeast of district headquarters Thrissur.

Location
The village, which is more of a temple town, is located on the banks of the Bharathappuzha river, with nearest towns being Chelakkara, Ottapalam, Pazhayannur, and Shoranur. The Vilwadrinatha Temple, which is among the rare Sri Rama temples in Kerala, is in Thiruvilwamala. Even though people believe the deity as Lord Rama, actually it is of Lord Vishnu. There is another shrine for Lord Lakshmana, the younger brother of Lord Rama, inside the temple. Both the brothers have equal importance here. There are sub-shrines for Ganesha, Hanuman, Shiva, Parvati, Ayyappan and Serpent deities. Niramaala are Ekadashi are festive events. The temple timings are from 5 A.M. to 11 A.M. and 5 P.M to 8 P.M on regular days.

Noted personalities
Noted writer V. K. N. (Vadakke Koottala Narayanankutty Nair), hailed from this place.
It has also been home for writers like Manasi, P.A. Divakaran, Marshal (Colonel Kizhiapate Rajamani). Late poet P. Kunhiraman Nair had stayed here for long, having fallen in love with the scenic beauty and culture of the place. Raobahadur T.K. Nair, a former Kochi state minister, hailed from this place. Current Kerala High Court Judge Sri. Ashok menon & Additional Director General of Police Sri.Padmakumar IPS belongs to thiruvilwamala.,.  Naval chief of Maharashtra, V. K Madhusoodanan belongs to Thiruvilwamala as well. The place has also given birth to prominent artists in the field of Kathakali, especially madhalam players like Venkichan Swamy and his pupils Appukutty Poduval & Chinna Kutta Poduval. It is the home of Carnatic musicians; the Sri Rama temple that hosts a relay south Indian classical concert on the auspicious day of ekadasi. Kasavu clothing is made in Kuthampully, a nearby village.

Temples
Thiruviwamala has many other ancient temples and more than four Shiva temples. Ivor Madom, the Krishna temple, has ceremonies performed in order to ensure peace after death. Other significant temple is Kayarampara Parakottu Kavu Devi temple.

Caves
Punarjani Guha (cave) is another major attraction in Thiruvilwamala, which is situated between the Vilwamala and the Bhoothamala towards the east of the Vilwadrinatha temple. It is a natural tunnel in the rocky hill. There is a belief that all the sins will be washed away if a person cross the cave from one end to the other and the person will be free from further births. Crossing the cave is difficult as one have to crawl through narrow sections to reach the other end. This ritual is known as 'Punarjani noozhal'. Only men are allowed to perform this ritual. This cave will be open to the public only on the Ekadasi day and hundreds of people participate in this ritual each year.

Festivals
The Parakkottukavu Thalappoli festival falls on the last Sunday of the Malayalam month of Medam (mid-May).The firework spectacles in this pooram would match up to the fireworks of the world-famous Thrissur Pooram.
Colonel S P Raman, who created history in Sciachen (highest battlefield in the world). and brother Advocate Sugashree also belong to this small town.

Kuzhi Minnal
Kuzhu Mannal (or Kuzhal Minnal) is gunpowder filled in earth holes and measured in pounds. It has enormous doppler effect due to the hilly Thiruvilwamala region. Picture here shows one of a series of end part of the Thalappoli fireworks .

Education 
 Govt. Vocational Higher Secondary School, Kattukulam
 G.U.P.S Kuthampully
 Seventh Day Adventist Higher Secondary School, Temple Rd
 Govt. Higher Secondary School, Pampady
 Nehru College of Engineering and Research Centre, Pampady
 Nehru College of Pharmacy, Pampady
 Christ New Life ICSE School, Punarjani Garden

See also
 Thiruvilwamala Temple
  Malayali people

External links

 thiruvilwamala.tk
 thiruvilwamala.com
 sreenarayanalokam.com

References

Villages in Thrissur district
Kathakali